Bridge of Spies is a 2015 historical legal thriller directed by Steven Spielberg. The screenplay was written by Matt Charman and Joel and Ethan Coen. The film is set during the Cold War and is based on the 1960 U-2 incident and its aftermath. Tom Hanks plays lawyer James B. Donovan who is tasked with negotiating the release of the captured American pilot Francis Gary Powers (Austin Stowell) in exchange for the convicted KGB spy Rudolf Abel (Mark Rylance). Alan Alda, Sebastian Koch, and Amy Ryan feature in supporting roles.

The film premiered at the 53rd New York Film Festival on October 4, 2015. Walt Disney Studios Motion Pictures gave the film a wide release on October 16 at over 2,800 theaters in the United States and Canada. Bridge of Spies grossed a worldwide total of over $165 million on a production budget of $40 million. Rotten Tomatoes, a review aggregator, surveyed 297 reviews and judged 91% to be positive. The film garnered many awards and nominations in a variety of categories with particular praise for Rylance's performance.

Bridge of Spies received six nominations at the 88th Academy Awards, including Best Picture, Best Original Screenplay, and Best Original Score. Rylance went on to win the Academy Award for Best Supporting Actor. At the 69th British Academy Film Awards, the film garnered nine nominations and won Best Supporting Actor for Rylance. He also won the Best Supporting Actor award from the AACTA Awards, New York Film Critics Circle, London Film Critics' Circle, Toronto Film Critics Association, and Vancouver Film Critics Circle. Rylance also received nominations at the Golden Globe Awards and the Screen Actors Guild Awards. Both the American Film Institute and the National Board of Review included Bridge of Spies in their top ten films of 2015.

Accolades

See also
 2015 in film

References

External links
 

Bridge of Spies
Disney-related lists